Calotrophon is a genus of sea snails, marine gastropod mollusks in the family Muricidae, the murex snails or rock snails.

Species
Species within the genus Calotrophon include:
 Calotrophon andrewsi Vokes, 1976
 Calotrophon carnicolor (Clench & Pérez Farfante, 1945)
 Calotrophon eugeniae (Vokes, 1992)
 Calotrophon gatunensis (Brown & Pilsbry, 1911)
 Calotrophon hemmenorum (Houart & Mühlhäusser, 1990)
 Calotrophon hystrix Garcia, 2006
 Calotrophon ostrearum (Conrad, 1846)
 Calotrophon turritus (Dall, 1919)
 Calotrophon velero (Vokes, 1970)
Species brought into synonymy 
 Calotrophon bristolae Hertlein & Strong, 1951: synonym of  Calotrophon turritus (Dall, 1919)
 Calotrophon emilyae Petuch, 1988 †: synonym of Calotrophon ostrearum (Conrad, 1846)

References

 Merle D., Garrigues B. & Pointier J.-P. (2011) Fossil and Recent Muricidae of the world. Part Muricinae. Hackenheim: Conchbooks. 648 pp. page(s): 189

External links
 https://www.biodiversitylibrary.org/page/50970044#page/115/mode/1up

Muricidae